The University of Gujrat (UOG) is a public university located in Gujrat, Punjab, Pakistan. It was established in 2004.

History
University of Gujrat was established in 2004 on the land donated by Hafiz Muhammad Hayat.

Recognized university

University of Gujrat is a recognized university by the Higher Education Commission of Pakistan and Pakistan Engineering Council. Among the 58 recognized Punjab higher-education institutions, it ranks at number 9 among the 'Top Universities in Punjab' in 2021. It ranks at number 24 among all over Pakistan.

Faculties
Faculty of Arts
Faculty of Computing & Information Technology
Faculty of Engineering & Technology
Faculty of Management & Administrative Sciences
Faculty of Science
Faculty of Social Sciences
School of Art Design & Architecture
Nawaz Sharif Medical College

References

External links
 UOG official website

Universities and colleges in Gujrat, Pakistan
Public universities in Punjab, Pakistan
Educational institutions established in 2004
2004 establishments in Pakistan
Public universities and colleges in Punjab, Pakistan